

Television

2010s

2000s

1990s

1980s
Zmsmsks

1970s

1960s

1950s

1940s

Substitutes

Play-by-play
Marty Glickman (1969-1970)
Spencer Ross (1974-1977)
Tim Ryan (1974-1977)
Bruce Beck (1980-1998)
Al Albert (1982-1983)
Sam Rosen (1984-1986)
Greg Gumbel (1988-1989)
Al Trautwig (1989-2012)
Mike Crispino (1992-2012)
Gus Johnson (1998-2010)
Mike Breen (2000-2004)
Bob Wischusen (2006–present)
Kenny Albert (2009–present)
Spero Dedes (2011-2014)
Ed Cohen (2017–present)

Color commentator
Kenny Smith (2005-2008)
Kelly Tripucka (2008-2012)
Doug Collins (2003-2004)

Radio

 Spanish language

 WADO: Clemson Smith-Muñiz (play-by-play), Ramón Rivas (color analyst)

2010s

2000s

1990s

1980s

1970s

1960s

1950s

1940s

It was not until the 1987–88 season that every Knicks' game was broadcast locally on radio in New York; for many years prior to that, only home games and (after the late 1940s) a handful of away games were heard. Regular-season away games heard on radio after the early 1960s were generally not broadcast locally on television.

Substitutes

Play-by-play
Jim Gordon (1963-1971)
Spencer Ross (1971-1976, 1999–2002)
Bob Wolff (1976-1986)
Sam Rosen (1979-1984)
Charley Steiner (1987-1988)
John Minko (1992-1999)
Gus Johnson (1998-2004)
Bob Papa (1998-2004)
Mike Crispino (2002-2010)
Kenny Albert (2009–present)
Spero Dedes (2011-2014)
Bob Wischusen (2012–present)
Ed Cohen (2017–present)

Studio Hosts
Win Elliott (1963-1971)
Jim Gordon (1971-1976)

References

Broadcasters
New York Knicks
 
Madison Square Garden Sports